is a sub-kilometer asteroid, classified as near-Earth asteroid of the Apollo group that was listed on the Sentry Risk Table.

Description 

It is estimated to be roughly 63 meters in diameter. In 2015 it was known to have a 1 in 63,000 chance of impacting Earth on 27 November 2015. It was removed from the Sentry Risk Table on 17 September 2015, but was still listed at NEODyS with odds of 1 in 3 million for 27 November 2015 during the approach window.

 was discovered on 15 November 2007 by the Mount Lemmon Survey at an apparent magnitude of 20 using a  reflecting telescope. On 28 November 2007, it passed  from Earth.  has an observation arc of 13 days with an uncertainty parameter of 7, which means its orbit is poorly constrained.  was last observed on 28 November 2007. By 1 December 2007, the asteroid had faded to below magnitude 25.

With an absolute magnitude of 23.6,  is about 50–110 meters in diameter.

References

External links 
 
 
 

Minor planet object articles (unnumbered)

Near-Earth objects in 2007
20071115
Discoveries by MLS